Ride a Crooked Mile is a 1938 American Western film directed by Alfred E. Green and written by Jack Moffitt and Ferdinand Reyher. The film stars Akim Tamiroff, Leif Erickson, Frances Farmer, Lynne Overman, John Miljan and J. M. Kerrigan. The film was released on December 9, 1938, by Paramount Pictures.

Plot

Cast 
Akim Tamiroff as Mike Balan
Leif Erickson as Johnny Simpkins
Frances Farmer as Trina
Lynne Overman as Oklahoma
John Miljan as Lt. Col. Stuart
J. M. Kerrigan as Sgt. Flynn
Vladimir Sokoloff as Glinka
Genia Nikolaieva as Marie Simpkins
Wade Crosby as George Rotz
Robert Gleckler as Warden
Nestor Paiva as Leroyd
Archie Twitchell as Byrd
Steve Pendleton as Bilks
Fred Kohler Jr. as Cpl. Bresline
 Eva Novak as Cashier

References

External links 
 

1938 films
American black-and-white films
Films directed by Alfred E. Green
Paramount Pictures films
American Western (genre) films
1938 Western (genre) films
1930s English-language films
1930s American films